Səbətlər (also, Sebetlyar) is a village and municipality in the Quba Rayon of Azerbaijan.  It has a population of 1,296.  The municipality consists of the villages of Səbətlər and Sırt Çiçi.

References

External links

Populated places in Quba District (Azerbaijan)